2004 World Junior Championships may refer to:

 Figure skating: 2004 World Junior Figure Skating Championships
 Ice hockey: 2004 World Junior Ice Hockey Championships
 Motorcycle speedway: 2004 Individual Speedway Junior World Championship

See also
 2004 World Cup (disambiguation)
 2004 Continental Championships (disambiguation)
 2004 World Championships (disambiguation)